Justin Patrick Huber (born 1 July 1982) is an Australian former professional baseball player. A first baseman and outfielder, Huber has played in Major League Baseball, Nippon Professional Baseball, and the Australian Baseball League. He has also played for the Australian national baseball team in international competitions.

Career

New York Mets 
Huber attended Beaconhills College and was signed as an international free agent as a catcher by the New York Mets in 2000.

Kansas City Royals 
Huber was one of the top prospects within the Mets organisation when he was traded to the Kansas City Royals before the 2004 trade deadline for José Bautista. Huber underwent surgery to repair torn cartilage in his left knee in August, ending his season.

This injury ended Huber's catching career, and by the time he made his major league debut on 21 June 2005, he was a first baseman. He made his first career appearance in the outfield on 17 September 2007 against the Chicago White Sox.

San Diego Padres 

On 26 March 2008, Huber was traded to the San Diego Padres for a player to be named later. He hit his first career home run on 20 April 2008, against Randy Johnson of the Arizona Diamondbacks. He became a free agent at the end of the season.

Minnesota Twins 
Huber signed a minor league contract with the Minnesota Twins in February 2009 and Huber received a September callup when the rosters expanded.

He was released at the end of the season and signed with the Hiroshima Carp for 40 million yen with 5.5 million in bonuses.

On 19 November 2010 while playing for the Melbourne Aces in the Australian Baseball League he was re-signed by the Twins to a minor league contract. After a poor spring, he was released by the Twins to make room for Scott Diamond.

He signed with Somerset Patriots of the Atlantic League of Professional Baseball for 2011 season.

References

External links

1982 births
2006 World Baseball Classic players
2009 World Baseball Classic players
2013 World Baseball Classic players
Australian expatriate baseball players in Japan
Australian expatriate baseball players in the United States
Major League Baseball players from Australia
Binghamton Mets players
Brooklyn Cyclones players
Kansas City Royals players
Living people
Major League Baseball first basemen
Major League Baseball left fielders
Norfolk Tides players
Omaha Royals players
Portland Beavers players
Rochester Red Wings players
San Diego Padres players
Minnesota Twins players
Sportspeople from Melbourne
Hiroshima Toyo Carp players
Somerset Patriots players